Following is a list of senators of Aveyron, people who have represented the department of Aveyron in the Senate of France.

Third Republic

Senators for Aveyron under the French Third Republic were:

 Adolphe Boisse (1876–1885)
 Jean Delsol (1876–1894)
 Pierre Lacombe (1885–1894)
 Émile Monsservin (1892–1911)
 Joseph Fabre (1894–1903)
 Antoine Ouvrier (1894–1912)
 Gabriel Vidal (Saint-Urbain) (1903–1921)
 Paul Cannac (1912–1921)
 Joseph Monsservin (1912–1944)
 Joseph Massabuau (1921–1930)
 Amédée Vidal (1921–1930)
 Eugène Raynaldy (1930–1938)
 Joseph Coucoureux (1930–1945)
 Jean Maroger (1939–1945)

Fourth Republic

Senators for Aveyron under the French Fourth Republic were:

 René Jayr (1946–1948)
 Raymond Bonnefous (1946–1959)
 Jean Maroger (1948–1956)
 Robert Laurens (1956–1959)

Fifth Republic 
Senators for Aveyron under the French Fifth Republic:

 Raymond Bonnefous (1959–1971)
 Robert Laurens (1959–1971)
 Roland Boscary-Monsservin (1971–1980)
 Albert Sirgue (1971–1980)
 Louis Lazuech (1980–1989)
 Raymond Cayrel (1993–1995)
 Jean Puech (1980–2008)
 Bernard Seillier (1989–2008)
 Anne-Marie Escoffier (2008–2012) and 2014 (Cabinet minister June 2012 to May 2014, replaced by Stéphane Mazars)
 Alain Fauconnier (2008–2014)
 Stéphane Mazars (2012–2014)
 Jean-Claude Luche from 1 October 2014
 Alain Marc from 1 October 2014

References

Sources

 
Lists of members of the Senate (France) by department